George Phillip Bryant (February 22, 1878 – April 18, 1938) was an American archer who competed in the 1904 Summer Olympics. He later became President of the Organising Committee for the Olympic Games for the 1932 Summer Olympics. He won two gold medals in Archery at the 1904 Summer Olympics in the double York and American rounds. In the team competition he won the bronze medal as part of the Boston Archery Club team. Bryant had not won any major titles before the Olympics, but later won national championships in 1905, 1909, 1911, and 1912.

Bryant was born in Melrose, Massachusetts. He graduated from Harvard University and Harvard Law School. He practiced law, was an executive with the Brant Rock Water Company, and served on the board of selectmen for Marshfield, Massachusetts. Bryant's wife Edith won the national handicap round at the 1912 national championship. His brother, Wallace Bryant, was also an Olympic archer and was on the bronze-medal team with him, before becoming a portrait artist.

References

External links

 profile

1878 births
1938 deaths
American male archers
Archers at the 1904 Summer Olympics
Olympic gold medalists for the United States in archery
Olympic bronze medalists for the United States in archery
Presidents of the Organising Committees for the Olympic Games
Medalists at the 1904 Summer Olympics
Harvard College alumni
Harvard Law School alumni
People from Melrose, Massachusetts
Sportspeople from Middlesex County, Massachusetts